Hrvoje Vuković (born 25 July 1979 in Split) is a former Croatian football player who last played for Alemannia Aachen in June 2009.

Career 
After relegation of Wacker Burghausen to Regionalliga Nord, Vuković signed a three-year contract with Alemannia Aachen, who relegated from the Bundesliga and left the team after the end of his contract on 30 June 2009.

References

External links
 
 
 
 Kicker Profile
 Hrvoje Vuković 

1979 births
Living people
Footballers from Split, Croatia
Association football defenders
Croatian footballers
Croatia youth international footballers
Croatia under-21 international footballers
HNK Hajduk Split players
SV Wacker Burghausen players
Alemannia Aachen players
Croatian Football League players
2. Bundesliga players
Croatian expatriate footballers
Expatriate footballers in Germany
Croatian expatriate sportspeople in Germany